The 2016–17 Oklahoma State Cowboys basketball team represented Oklahoma State University in the 2016–17 NCAA Division I men's basketball season. They were led by first-head coach Brad Underwood. The Cowboys were members of the Big 12 Conference and played their home games at Gallagher-Iba Arena in Stillwater, Oklahoma. They finished the season 20–13, 9–9 in Big 12 play to finish in fifth place. They lost to Iowa State in the quarterfinals of the Big 12 tournament. They received an at-large bid to the NCAA tournament as the No. 10 seed in the Midwest region where they lost to Michigan in the first round.

On March 18, 2017, head coach Brad Underwood left the school to accept the head coaching position at Illinois after one year at OSU. The school promoted assistant coach Mike Boynton Jr. to head coach on March 24.

Previous season 
The Cowboys finished the 2015–16 season 12–20, 3–15 in Big 12 play to finish in ninth place. They lost in the first round of the Big 12 tournament to Kansas State.

On March 18, 2016, Travis Ford was fired after nine seasons at Oklahoma State. On May 22, 2016, Brad Underwood was hired as head coach.

Departures

Recruits 

Note: Tyrek Coger was a junior college transfer from Cape Fear Community College who was to enroll in the fall of 2016. On July 21, 2016, Coger collapsed and died after a workout.

Roster

Schedule and results

|-
!colspan=9 style=| Exhibition

|-
!colspan=9 style=| Regular season

|-
!colspan=9 style=| Big 12 tournament

|-
!colspan=9 style=| NCAA tournament

CSN = Cowboy Sports Network. The Cowboy Sports Network is affiliated with Fox Sports Net. Games could air on Fox Sports Oklahoma, Fox Sports Oklahoma Plus, Fox Sports Southwest, Fox Sports Southwest Plus, or Fox College Sports.

References

Oklahoma State Cowboys basketball seasons
Oklahoma State
Oklahoma State Cowboys bask
Oklahoma State Cowboys bask
Oklahoma State